Festival Napa Valley is a music, food, wine and lifestyle festival held in Napa Valley, California. It is presented by Napa Valley Festival Association, a nonprofit corporation governed by a board of vintners and local leaders.

More than 200 musicians, wineries, resorts, theaters, restaurants, chefs, and vintners participate every year. The festival presents a summer season every July and some years in the spring and fall. Performances take place at theaters, wineries, resorts, estates, and vineyard settings throughout Napa Valley. The festival also presents year-round school programming and is the leading private funder of arts education in Napa County public schools.

Overview 
The festival attracts more than 10,000 guests to some 80-100 events each year that span all genres from classical music to jazz to theater and dance.

The festival has hosted hundreds of musicians, including violinists Joshua Bell, Regina Carter, Sarah Chang, Chad Hoopes, Midori, Dmitri Sitkovetsky, Nikolaj Znaider, and Pinchas Zukerman; pianists Piotr Anderszewski, Leif Ove Andsnes, Shelly Berg, Simone Dinnerstein, Aldo Lopez-Gavilan, Helene Grimaud, Tara Kamangar, Vadym Kholodenko, Kristin Pankonin, Simon Trpčeski, Conrad Tao, Christopher Taylor, Jean-Yves Thibaudet, Andre Watts, and Joyce Yang; vocalists Ildar Abdrazakov, Kathleen Battle, Angel Blue, Marnie Breckenridge, Christine Brewer, Measha Brueggergosman, Julia Bullock, Kristin Chenoweth, Franc D'Ambrosio, David Daniels, Danielle de Niese, Lisa Delan, Francesco Demuro, Jordan Donica, Michael Fabiano, Renee Fleming, Susan Graham, Jill Grove, Nathan Gunn, Lani Hall, Aleksandra Kurzak, Isabel Leonard, Guido Loconsolo, Lester Lynch, Nino Machaidze, Monica Mancini, Larisa Martinez, Elena Maximova, Audra McDonald, Melody Moore, Kelley O'Connor, Eric Owens, Matthew Polenzani, Gino Quilico, Samuel Ramey, Nadine Sierra, Paulo Szot, James Valenti, Anne Sofie von Otter, Frederica von Stade, and Nikki Yanofsky; cellists Matt Haimovitz, Nina Kotova, Kevin Olusola, and Jan Vogler; flutists James Galway and Maxim Rubtsov; guitarist Angel Romero; saxophonist Dave Koz; and trumpeters Herb Alpert, Chris Botti, and Arturo Sandoval.

Conductors have included Alondra de la Parra, Stephane Deneve, James Gaffigan, Daiana Garcia, Alan Gilbert, Nicola Luisotti, Nicholas McGegan, Carlo Montanaro, Constantine Orbelian, Antonio Pappano, Carlo Ponti, Joel Revzen, Martin West, and Jaap van Zweden.

Featured orchestras and ensembles have included the Concord Jazz All-Stars, Dallas Symphony Orchestra, Emerson String Quartet, Festival Orchestra Napa, RNO Four Strings, Havana Chamber Orchestra, LA Virtuosi Orchestra, Les Violettes, Mark O'Connor Family Band, Napa Valley Symphony, Philharmonia Baroque Orchestra, Philharmonic Orchestra of the Americas, Rossetti String Quartet, Russian National Orchestra, Sphinx Symphony Orchestra, Tiempo Libre, UBS Verbier Chamber Orchestra, Uccello, Volti Chorus, and Young People's Chorus of New York City.

Other performers have included Cirque du Soleil, David Foster & Friends, Charice, Kenny "Babyface" Edmonds, Mamak Khadem, Sergio Mendes, and Ruben Studdard.

Dancers appearing at the festival have come from American Ballet Theatre, Project Bandaloop, Bolshoi Ballet, Joffrey Ballet, Les Ballets Trockadero de Monte Carlo, National Ballet of Canada, New York City Ballet, The Royal Ballet, San Francisco Ballet, Staatsballett Berlin, and Stuttgart Ballet.

Guest chefs have included Dan Barber, Michael Chiarello, Michel Cornu, Cat Cora, Gary Danko, Tiffany Derry, Mark Dommen, Ken Frank, Thomas Keller, Mourad Lahlou, Cindy Pawlcyn, Richard Reddington, and Ming Tsai.

Actors and directors who have appeared at the festival include Jamie Bernstein, Francis Ford Coppola, Hugh Dancy, Minnie Driver, Whoopi Goldberg, Dennis Haysbert, Allison Janney, Michael Keaton, Sophia Loren, Christopher Meloni, Rita Moreno, Bill Murray, Craig T. Nelson, Chris Noth, Robert Redford, Tamara Tunie, and Alfre Woodard.

Events 
Artists and guests mingle at daily Vintner's Luncheons and Patron Dinners. Among the wineries that have hosted luncheons and dinners are Alpha Omega, B Cellars, Beaulieu Vineyard, Bespoke Collection, Boisset Family Estates, Bouchaine Vineyards, Buena Vista Winery, Calistoga Ranch, Cardinale, Castello di Amorosa, Castellucci Napa Valley, Charles Krug, Chimney Rock, Cliff Lede Vineyards, Colgin Cellars, Continuum, Darioush, Davis Estates, Domaine Carneros, Dominus Estate, Ehlers Estate, Eleven Eleven, Far Niente, Frank Family Vineyard, Gargiulo Vineyards, Grgich Hills, HALL Napa Valley, Hess Collection, Keller Estate, Lail Vineyards, Martin Estate, Merryvale, Napa Valley Reserve, Pride Mountain Vineyards, Odette, Opus One, Peju Winery, Promontory, Quintessa, Robert Mondavi Winery, Round Pond, Roy Estate, Seven Stones, Silver Oak, Somerston, Spottswoode, Spring Mountain Vineyard, Stag's Leap Wine Cellars, St. Supery, Sterling Vineyards, Swanson Vineyards, Tamber Bey, Trefethen Family Vineyards, Trinchero, V. Sattui, VGS Chateau Potelle, Vineyard 29, and Yao Family Wines. Resorts that have hosted festival events include Auberge du Soleil, Calistoga Ranch, Carneros Resort & Spa, Las Alcobas, Meadowood, Meritage, Silverado Resort & Spa, Solage, The Ink House, Vista Collina, and The Westin Verasa.

Taste of Napa, part of the festival, showcases wine and culinary delicacies from approximately 80 local wineries, restaurants, and food artisans. Many of the wineries that participate are rarely open to the public.

The festival's wellness events include conversations led by health practitioners and a 5K/10K Sun Run with proceeds supporting the Napa County Alliance for Arts Education.

The Arts for All Gala takes place the first Sunday of the festival's summer season every July. The evening features an alfresco dinner, live performances, and surprise guests, and culminates in a charity wine auction featuring one-of-a-kind lifestyle experiences. The 2017 Arts for All Gala, held at HALL Napa Valley, raised a record $2.5 million, placing it among the most successful charity wine auctions in the United States. Proceeds from the event provide free and affordable access to festival performances and support public school arts education programs in Napa County, scholarships for emerging musicians, and the festival's tuition-free Blackburn Music Academy.

In 2014 the festival presented a tribute to Sophia Loren at Far Niente. Loren's son, Carlo Ponti, debuted the Los Angeles Virtuosi Orchestra, an ensemble devoted to the advocacy and support of music education. Whoopi Goldberg emceed the tribute for 400 guests, which included Robert Redford, Francis Ford Coppola and former Speaker of the House Newt Gingrich. Robert De Niro and Former President Bill Clinton sent in tributes via video.

In 2016 the festival presented a tribute to Margrit Mondavi, also at Far Niente. Jazz musician Dave Koz and vocalist Monica Mancini performed. Notable guests included Sophia Loren and Lidia Bastianich. Among those celebrating Ms. Mondavi in person or by video were Beth Nickel, Maria Manetti Shrem, Francis Ford Coppola, Thomas Keller, Jacques Pepin, Boz Scaggs, Piero Antinori, and Lamberto Frescobaldi. The tribute was one of Margrit Mondavi's last public appearances and she died less than six weeks later.

In 2018, the festival feted its Founding Chair Darioush Khaledi and his wife Shahpar, culminating in a private concert and dinner featuring Sarah Chang and Aldo Lopez-Gavilan, hosted by Jeff and Valerie Gargiulo at Gargiulo Vineyards.

2020 saw the festival go virtual caused by the COVID-19 pandemic.

In 2021, the festival returned to live programming with a full schedule running from July 16–25, 2021.

Programs 
Festival Napa Valley has awarded more than $1 million to support Napa County public school visual and performing arts programs. The festival has fulfilled teacher "Wish Lists" for classroom resources and materials, has underwritten the creation of Napa County's first-ever arts education master plan in partnership with Arts Council Napa Valley and the Napa Valley Unified School District, and has taken a lead role in ensuring access to quality arts education for all K-12 students. Festival grants have provided funding for a district-wide Visual and Performing Arts Coordinator; a music teacher to serve Napa's three largest middle schools; and the creation of a professional development program to encourage arts integration into all classrooms. Festival Napa Valley has also partnered with the Napa County Office of Education to ensure arts education for the county's most disenfranchised students at Camille Creek Community School, through funding a weekly arts education class, establishing a creative room on campus, and initiating an annual Concert on the Green on the Camille Creek campus. On April 5, 2018, We McDonald, a finalist from NBC's "The Voice," inaugurated the Concert on the Green with a performance and question and answer session with the students.

Young artist series and concert
The festival's Bouchaine Young Artists Series is an admission-free concert series featuring performances by emerging stars. Sponsored by Bouchaine Vineyards, the concerts provide an opportunity for young artists to perform in a professional environment. Festival Napa Valley awards a monetary scholarship, underwritten by Tatiana and Gerret Copeland and Bouchaine Vineyards, to each participating artist. Inaugurated in 2008, the series has presented the Napa debuts of more than 50 artists and ensembles including Marika Bournaki, Julia Bullock, Xavier Foley, Daniel Hsu, guitarist Jiji, Nikolay Khozyainov, Hyejin Kim, Wei Luo, Johannes Moser, Natasha Paremski, Tessa Seymour, Stephen Waarts, and the Young People's Chorus of New York City.

Each season Festival Napa Valley presents a series of admission-free concerts. In the 2018 season more than 20 concerts will be presented free of charge. The festival also distributes thousands of free and discounted concert tickets each year to seniors, veterans and families.

Summer camps 
In 2018, Festival Napa Valley funded two tuition-free summer camps for the Boys & Girls Clubs' Napa and American Canyon clubhouses, each serving 250 students ages 6–18. The program features a robust arts curriculum designed to encourage students to create, explore and discover, a daily interactive music experience, and attendance at the festival's Concert for Kids featuring a headlining artist.

Music academy 
Festival Napa Valley's Blackburn Music Academy offers a tuition-free immersive training and performance experience for 80 emerging pre-professional musicians from around the world. In 2017, the academy's inaugural year, applications were submitted by hundreds of students from 119 schools and conservatories, from 45 states and seven countries. Academy musicians are provided complimentary lodging during their Festival Napa Valley experience through the generosity of local host families. They participate in chamber music and orchestral concerts, workshops, sectionals, and other professional development sessions with Festival Napa Valley artists. Guest artists and coaches for 2018 include Joshua Bell and principal musicians from the Russian National Orchestra, MET Opera Orchestra and other leading ensembles.

Vocal arts series 
With support from Festival Napa Valley benefactors Jan Shrem and Maria Manetti Shrem, the festival presents leading vocalists and emerging talent in concert halls and intimate settings throughout Napa Valley, including Lincoln Theater, Napa Valley Opera House, Meadowood, Jarvis Conservatory, and Castello di Amorosa.

Dance series 
San Francisco philanthropist Dede Wilsey underwrites the festival's dance series, which has featured dancers from American Ballet Theatre, Bandaloop, Bolshoi Ballet, Joffrey Ballet, Les Ballets Trockadero de Monte Carlo, National Ballet of Canada, New York City Ballet, Royal Ballet, San Francisco Ballet, StaatsBallett Berlin and Stuttgart Ballet, among others. The Napa Regional Dance Company and other programs for young dancers are also presented through the series.

Festival Napa Valley was founded in 2006 by San Francisco Bay Area attorney and arts manager Richard Walker and IMG Artists Chairman Barrett Wissman, along with Executive Producer Charles Letourneau. The festival was launched with financial support from Ann and Gordon Getty, Tatiana and Gerret Copeland, Maria Manetti and Jan Shrem, Athena and Timothy Blackburn, Diane Wilsey, John Traina, and Robert and Margrit Mondavi, among other noted philanthropists. Founding Partner Wineries included PlumpJack, Darioush, Far Niente, Bouchaine Vineyards, HALL Napa Valley, Peju Winery, Quintessa, Blackbird Vineyards, Castello di Amorosa, Gargiulo Vineyards, and Robert Mondavi Winery. The founders sought to create a festival that would define Napa Valley as a cultural destination.

References

External links
 Official website

2006 establishments in California
Classical music festivals in the United States
Jazz festivals in California
Festivals in the San Francisco Bay Area
Food and drink festivals in the United States
Food and drink in the San Francisco Bay Area
Recurring events established in 2006
Tourist attractions in Napa County, California